South Windsor High School is located in South Windsor, Connecticut. It currently serves grades 9-12 with approximately 1,364 students and a 13:1 student-teacher ratio. It is the only high school in  South Windsor, but also admits students from Hartford through the Open Choice Program. The school offers a variety of courses spanning departments such as mathematics, science, social studies, language arts, foreign languages, music, art, and technology. The school also offers over 80 options for extracurricular activities and 30 options for afterschool athletics.

Noteworthy events 

2002: South Windsor high School was the state's first municipal facility to be powered and heated by a fuel cell, made possible by a funding program through the Connecticut Clean Energy Fund. The PureCell 200 kW fuel cell was manufactured and installed by South Windsor-based UTC Power, a division of United Technologies Corporation.

April 2005: Four students at South Windsor High School wore T-shirts bearing anti-gay marriage slogans. At the time, the Connecticut General Assembly voted to legalize civil unions in the state. School administrators asked the students to remove the shirts, but they refused and were asked to leave school grounds. The content of the shirts and the actions of school administrators raised issues of free speech within a school environment. The ACLU, among other groups, criticized the school's actions.

October 2006: Three members of the South Windsor High School football team were suspended from the team for posting a derogatory video on Myspace. The video emphasized the use of explicit language and violence against opposing teams and players. This event brought into scope the continuing trend of socially unacceptable material posted on Myspace and Facebook.

December 2006: The ACLU threatened legal action against South Windsor Public Schools since the graduation ceremony is held at a church in Bloomfield. The organization contends that this is a violation of separation of church and state.

April 2007: Bobcat Robotics, the South Windsor High School FIRST Robotics Competition team won the international FIRST Championship event in Atlanta, partnered with teams from Worcester, Massachusetts and Las Vegas, Nevada.

April 2010: Bobcat Robotics, the South Windsor High School FIRST Robotics team won the FIRST international championship for a second time, partnered with teams from Milford, Michigan and Redondo Beach, California.

November 2011: South Windsor High School served as a community shelter for nine consecutive days and nights in the aftermath of Winter Storm Alfred. When grid power failed, emergency response mechanisms kicked in, with fuel cell systems supplying critical electrical power, as well as heat and hot water.
Town Manager Matt Galligan said 200 people from South Windsor and neighboring towns were sleeping in the high school each night. Fuel cell power helped more than 600 people eat three hot meals a day prepared by kitchen staff. The nurses' station was operational; there were hot showers and charging stations for electronics.

May 2015: South Windsor High School suspends and eventually compels the resignation of a tenured and decorated teacher for involvement in a reading of Allen Ginsberg's poem "Please Master" during an Advanced Placement English Class.

August 2016: Newsweek ranked South Windsor High School as 348/500 on their list of the top 500 high schools in the United States in 2016.

Athletics
South Windsor high school is part of the CCC, the Central Connecticut Conference competing in the East division. Athletic accomplishments include the CIAC Division II ice hockey championships in 1976 and 1997.

Notable alumni 

Lewis Craparotta, U.S. Marine Corps lieutenant general
Romil Hemnani, member of the musical group Brockhampton
Brent Morin, Actor, Comedian

References

External links 
 

Schools in Hartford County, Connecticut
Public high schools in Connecticut
South Windsor, Connecticut